Joseph Michael Francis (born 11 December 1970) is a former Australian politician who was a Liberal Party member of the Legislative Assembly of Western Australia from 2008 to 2017, representing the seat of Jandakot. He was a minister in the Barnett government from March 2013 to March 2017, and was considered a front runner for the Liberal Party leadership until he lost his seat at the 2017 state election.

Early life
Francis was born in Sydney, New South Wales, to Robyn Caroline Mitchell and Charles Henry Francis. He has one sister Janelle May Francis. His primary education was at Spiritus Sanctus Primary school at North Ryde NSW. He attended Saint Ignatius' College, Riverview, and after leaving school joined the Royal Australian Navy. He served in the navy from 1989 to 1994, and subsequently worked as a political staffer for several years. Francis moved to Western Australia in 2000, operating a small business. He re-enlisted in the navy in 2002, and served as a navigator and warfare officer with the RAN Submarine Service, initially aboard HMAS Farncomb and later as an instructor at a training centre.

Politics
In 2008, Francis left the navy in order to run for parliament at the 2008 state election. He was elected to the newly created seat of Jandakot, which had been created with a notional majority for the Labor Party. In June 2012, Francis was appointed parliamentary secretary to the Minister for Finance, the Minister for Commerce, and the Minister for Small Business. After the 2013 state election, where he increased his majority in Jandakot, Francis was elevated to the ministry, becoming Minister for Emergency Services, Minister for Corrective Services, and Minister for Veterans. In August 2013, he was also made Minister for Small Business. He relinquished that position to Sean L'Estrange in a reshuffle in March 2016, but was made Minister for Fisheries instead.

After losing the seat of Jandakot at the 2017 state election, Francis was appointed general manager of Australian Transit Group. In 2019, he was appointed to the Administrative Appeals Tribunal.

Community 
Francis was appointed (2017 - current) as WA Chair of the Duke of Edinburgh's International Award - Australia

See also
 Barnett Ministry

References

1970 births
Living people
Liberal Party of Australia members of the Parliament of Western Australia
Members of the Western Australian Legislative Assembly
People educated at Saint Ignatius' College, Riverview
Politicians from Sydney
Royal Australian Navy personnel
Submariners
21st-century Australian politicians